Xenorhabdus innexi  is a bacterium from the genus of Xenorhabdus which has been isolated from the nematode Steinernema scapterisci in Uruguay.

References

Further reading

External links
Type strain of Xenorhabdus innexi at BacDive -  the Bacterial Diversity Metadatabase	

Bacteria described in 2005